General elections were held in Mexico on 21 August 1994. The presidential elections resulted in a victory for Ernesto Zedillo of the Institutional Revolutionary Party (PRI), whilst the PRI won 300 of the 500 seats in the Chamber of Deputies and 95 of the 128 seats in the Senate. Voter turnout ranged from 77.4% in the proportional representation section of the Chamber elections to 75.9% in the constituency section.

These were the first presidential elections in Mexico that were monitored by international observers. Turnout was just over 77% of those eligible. To date, the 1994 elections mark the last time a presidential candidate won in all 31 states and Mexico City. 

Although tension did not reach the level it did around the 1988 election, most political analysts agree that voters (in the aftermath of the Zapatista uprising that began in January and the assassination of the original PRI candidate Luis Donaldo Colosio), opted for continuity by allowing the PRI to remain in power, fearing that the country might otherwise be destabilized. While the election itself was generally considered clean, with no major irregularities, there was much criticism directed at the inequity of the campaigns, with the ruling PRI having a disproportionate advantage in regards to campaign financing and mass media exposure.

Background 
The 1994 election took place in an atmosphere of political instability after the rise of the Zapatista Army of National Liberation (EZLN) on 1 January that year. The insurgency was a serious hit on the image that the Government wanted to portray of a developed, advanced country, and it highlighted the negative effects of the neoliberal reforms enacted by the Salinas administration.

In the past six years, the right-wing opposition Partido Acción Nacional (PAN) had won many state elections, and was seen as a serious contender for the presidency in 1994. On the other hand, the left-wing Partido de la Revolucion Democratica (PRD), while building a wide social base, had failed to win any state governorship, which its leaders blamed on repression and electoral fraud by the PRI-controlled federal government.

Campaign

Nominations
 

Outgoing President Carlos Salinas de Gortari chose his Secretary of Social Development, Luis Donaldo Colosio, to be the PRI presidential candidate. Salinas' choice sparked a brief internal conflict in the government, as Manuel Camacho Solís, who was then Mayor of Mexico City, had expected himself to be the PRI candidate, and quit his position in protest. President Salinas immediately appointed Camacho as Minister of Foreign Relations to hide the conflict, and tried to appease him. In the aftermath of the Zapatista uprising, Camacho was designated Peace Commissioner in Chiapas.

The PAN chose Diego Fernández de Cevallos as their candidate through an internal convention.

Cuauhtémoc Cárdenas ran for the presidency once again, this time as the candidate of the PRD, the party he founded in 1989.

Six other parties presented their candidates.

Early campaign

In the initial months of the campaign, PRI candidate Colosio expressed dissatisfaction with his campaign management, as polls indicated his popular support was far lower than earlier PRI candidates. Colosio's campaign lacked funding and had problems getting media coverage in the wake of the Zapatista uprising in Chiapas. Due to this poor performance, the PRI leadership considered replacing Colosio as the presidential candidate. At the same time, Camacho's popularity was rising due to his role as mediator in the Zapatista conflict, and it was rumoured that he might replace Colosio as the presidential candidate. At one point, President Salinas had to state to the media "Don't get confused, Colosio is the candidate".

Due to his campaign's underperformance, Colosio tried to distance himself from the outgoing President. On 6 March  1994, the anniversary of the PRI's founding, Colosio broke with Salinas in a controversial-but-popular speech in front of the Monumento a la Revolución in Mexico City. In his speech, Colosio spoke against government abuse, and in support of indigenous peoples and the people's independence from government. The speech was controversial, as it echoed many of the beliefs of the ZANL platform.

On 22 March, Camacho himself stated that he was not interested in being the PRI candidate, instead focusing on the Chiapas conflict. The day after Camacho's statement, Colosio was killed.

Assassination of Colosio

At 5:05 PM PST on 23 March, at a campaign rally in Lomas Taurinas, a poor neighborhood of Tijuana, Colosio was shot in the head with a .38 Special by Mario Aburto Martínez at a distance of a few centimeters. Colosio collapsed and was rushed to the city's main hospital after plans to fly him to an American hospital were cancelled. His death was announced a few hours later amid inconsistent eyewitness reports. The assassination of Colosio was the first magnicide to occur in Mexico since the murder of Álvaro Obregón in 1928.

The assassination had a profound impact on Mexican public opinion, already tumultuous by the conflict in Chiapas.

Many conspiracy theories about the assassination persist, including that it was orchestrated by drug traffickers. However, the most accepted theory among the Mexican people is that he was betrayed by his party and that the murder was orchestrated by high members of PRI, including President Salinas, as Colosio had begun to reject Salinas's political agenda.

The assassin, Mario Aburto Martínez
The shooter, Mario Aburto Martínez, was arrested at the site and never wavered from his story that he had acted alone. Nonetheless, many theories still surround the assassination. The authorities were criticized for their poor handling of Aburto, having shaved, bathed, and given him a prison haircut before showing him to the media, which started rumors about whether a man who looked so different from the one arrested was really the murderer. Colosio received three bullet wounds, and it was never clear if they could have been done by a single person or not. The case was officially closed after many prosecutors investigated it, but after the many mishandlings of the investigation and contradictory versions, the controversy continues. Aburto remains imprisoned at the high-security La Palma facility in Almoloya de Juárez.

Selection of the new PRI candidate 

President Salinas declared three days of national mourning after Colosio's death, while all the opposition candidates lamented the assassination and called for an end to political violence.

In the aftermath, many PRI members sought to replace the dead candidate. In the end, President Salinas chose Ernesto Zedillo, who had been Colosio's campaign manager, as the new PRI presidential candidate. Zedillo had been Secretary of Education, a relatively unimportant ministry; he had resigned to run the campaign of Colosio. Zedillo had never held elective office, sharing that trait with many previous presidents, but Zedillo was not otherwise politically experienced. He was perceived as a weak candidate. It was speculated that Salinas wished to perpetuate his power as Plutarco Elías Calles had in the wake of the 1928 assassination of president-elect Alvaro Obregón, controlling successor presidents.

Televised debates 

For the first time in Mexican history, the 1994 campaign featured televised debates between the Presidential candidates. On 12 May, the three main contenders Zedillo, Fernández de Cevallos, and Cárdenas participated in the first Presidential debate in Mexican history. An estimated audience of 34 million watched the debate. Polls after the debate indicated that the PAN candidate, Diego Fernández de Cevallos, had defeated the other two candidates, and had become capable of defeating the PRI candidate in the elections. 

A phone survey carried out by the Oficina de la Presidencia de la República Mexicana after the debate shows the widespread perception of Cevallos' victory in the debate, as well as Zedillo's lackluster performance and the appalling reception of Cárdenas' performance:

However, in the aftermath of the debate, Fernández de Cevallos seemed to decrease his media presence, and Zedillo continued in the first place at the polls; on the other hand, the polls also indicated that Zedillo might win with less than 50% of the popular vote, something unprecedented for a PRI candidate (notwithstanding previous controversial elections in which the PRI was accused of fraud).

After the 12 May debate between the main three contenders, there was also a debate between the Presidential candidates of smaller parties.

Opinion polls

Results

President

By state
Based on the official results of the Federal Electoral Institute.

Senate

Chamber of Deputies

Aftermath
Neither the opposition nor international observers denounced major irregularities in the election, and Zedillo's victory was mostly accepted as definitive. However, there was considerable criticism towards the inequity regarding campaign financing and media exposure, both of which disproportionately favoured the PRI: the PRI alone was responsible for 78.3% of the reported campaign expenses in 1994, while the PAN was responsible for 10.4% and the PRD for 1.52% of said expenses. Zedillo himself stated, during an international tour in 1995, that the election which had brought him into the Presidency had been "legal, but unequal". PAN candidate Diego Fernández de Cevallos would later say that he hadn't been defeated by Zedillo, but "by [President] Salinas and Televisa". Subsequent political and electoral reforms sought to provide clear rules for campaign financing, as well as less unequal access to the mass media for the opposition parties.

See also
History of Mexico
Index of Mexico-related articles

References

Mexico
General
Legislative elections in Mexico
Presidential elections in Mexico
August 1994 events in Mexico